Rick Is 21 is the sixth album by rock and roll and pop idol Rick Nelson, and was released in 1961. 
The album was almost entirely recorded in Los Angeles, California, United States at the famous United Western Recorders studios from February to April, 1961. Only one song was recorded at Master Recorders studios in Hollywood, California, United States. That song was: Do You Know What it Means To Miss New Orleans recorded in February, 1960.
The album was the first to credit his first name as "Rick"; previous albums were credited to Ricky Nelson. Jimmie Haskell was the arranger. Ricky Nelson, Ozzie Nelson and Jimmie Haskell as well were the producers.

The album peaked #8 on the Billboard 200 chart. Successful singles from the album include "Travelin' Man" and "Hello Mary Lou".

Track listing
"My One Desire" (Dorsey Burnette) – 2:14  
"That Warm Summer Night" (Jerry Fuller)  – 2:11
"Break My Chain" (Jerry Fuller)   – 1:53 
"Do You Know What It Means to Miss New Orleans?" (Louis Alter, Eddie DeLange) – 2:32 
"I'll Make Believe" (Johnny Rivers) – 2:18 
"Travelin' Man" (Jerry Fuller) – 2:12 
"Oh Yeah, I'm in Love" (Gregory Carroll, Doris Payne) – 2:08 
"Everybody But Me" (Dave Burgess) – 2:11 
"Lucky Star" (Dave Burgess) – 2:17 
"Sure Fire Bet" (Gene Pitney) –2:07 
"Stars Fell on Alabama" (Mitchell Parish, Frank Perkins) –  2:34 
"Hello Mary Lou" (Gene Pitney) – 2:17

Charts

Album

Singles

References

1961 albums
Ricky Nelson albums
Pop rock albums by American artists
Imperial Records albums